Leposternon cerradensis is a worm lizard species in the family Amphisbaenidae. It is found in Brazil.

References

Leposternon
Reptiles described in 2008
Taxa named by Síria Ribeiro
Taxa named by Wilian Vaz-Silva
Taxa named by Alfredo P. Santos Jr.
Endemic fauna of Brazil
Reptiles of Brazil